Flaminio may refer to:

Geography
 Flaminio (Rome), a quartiere
 Flaminio – Piazza del Popolo (Rome Metro), an underground station
 Rignano Flaminio, a comune in the Metropolitan City of Rome
 Stadio Flaminio, a stadium in Rome

Other
 Il Flaminio, a 1735 comic opera by Giovanni Battista Pergolesi